St Lawrence's Church (Spanish: Iglesia de San Lorenzo) is a ruined medieval church located in Toledo, Spain.

History
It was built on the site of a mosque. 
In 1121 the church is mentioned for the first time, as one of the city's Mozarab parish churches. The building as it survives is later, but preserves some mudejar features.

In the 18th century San Lorenzo was renovated, expanding it.

Conservation
In 1936, due to a fire, it was reduced to ruins. Today only the walls and the tower remain standing. They are protected by the heritage listing Bien de Interés Cultural.

References

External links

Bien de Interés Cultural landmarks in the City of Toledo
Church ruins in Spain
Former mosques in Spain
Toledo
18th-century Roman Catholic church buildings in Spain
Lorenzo